Sean McCafferty  (born 17 December 1944) is an Irish boxer. He competed in the men's flyweight event at the 1964 Summer Olympics.

References

1944 births
Living people
Irish male boxers
Olympic boxers of Ireland
Boxers at the 1964 Summer Olympics
Place of birth missing (living people)
Flyweight boxers